In mathematics, specifically category theory, an overcategory (and undercategory) is a distinguished class of categories used in multiple contexts, such as with covering spaces (espace etale). They were introduced as a mechanism for keeping track of data surrounding a fixed object  in some category . There is a dual notion of undercategory, which is defined similarly.

Definition 
Let  be a category and  a fixed object of pg 59.

Properties 
In addition, this applies to limits and colimits as well.

Examples

Overcategories on a site 
Recall that a site  is a categorical generalization of a topological space first introduced by Grothendieck. One of the canonical examples comes directly from topology, where the category  whose objects are open subsets  of some topological space , and the morphisms are given by inclusion maps.

Category of algebras as an undercategory 
The category of commutative -algebras is equivalent to the undercategory  for the category of commutative rings. This is because the structure of an -algebra on a commutative ring  is directly encoded by a ring morphism . If we consider the opposite category, it is an overcategory of affine schemes, or just .

Overcategories of spaces 
Another common overcategory considered in the literature are overcategories of spaces, such as schemes, smooth manifolds, or topological spaces. Fiber products in these categories can be considered intersections, given the objects are subobjects of the fixed object.

See also 

 Comma category

References 

Category theory